Johan Brunström and Raven Klaasen were the defending champions, but Klaasen chose not to participate.  Brunström plays alongside Philipp Oswald, but they lost in the first round to Tomasz Bednarek and André Sá.
Mariusz Fyrstenberg and Marcin Matkowski won the title, defeating Marin Draganja and Henri Kontinen in the final, 6–7(3–7), 6–3, [10–8].

Seeds

Draw

Draw

References
 Main Draw

Doubles
Moselle Open